The Imagined Village is a folk music project founded by Simon Emmerson of Afro Celt Sound System. It is intended to produce modern folk music that represented modern multiculturalism in the United Kingdom and as such, featured musicians from a wide variety of ethnic and cultural backgrounds.  The name of the project came from the 1993 book The Imagined Village by Georgina Boyes.

The project started in 2004, and led to the release of an eponymous album in 2007 by a collective of artists on Real World Records. Some of the tracks on it are modern re-interpretations of traditional folk songs.

The Imagined Village E.P. was released earlier in 2007, and is a remix of the album tracks. The 2008 BBC Radio 2 Folk Awards voted "Cold, Hailey, Rainy Night" as best traditional track.

In 2009, the project moved to a new record label, ECC Records, and a second album, Empire & Love was released in January 2010, followed by Bending the Dark in May 2012.

Discography

The Imagined Village

The Imagined Village E.P.

Empire & Love

Bending the Dark

Line-ups
The Imagined Village live band have toured since November 2007. The original lineup consisted of Billy Bragg, Martin Carthy, Eliza Carthy, Sheila Chandra, Chris Wood and The Young Coppers, backed by a band featuring Simon Emmerson, Johnny Kalsi, Francis Hylton, Andy Gangadeen, Sheema Mukherjee and Barney Morse Brown. They also appeared on Later with Jools Holland.

A revised lineup was announced for their 2010 tour, coinciding with the release of Empire & Love: Martin Carthy, Eliza Carthy, and Chris Wood, backed by a band featuring Simon Emmerson, Johnny Kalsi, Ali Friend, Andy Gangadeen, Simon Richmond, Sheema Mukherjee and Barney Morse Brown.

In 2011 Jackie Oates replaced Chris Wood for their live performances including at the Shrewsbury Folk Festival. The musicians credited on Bending the Dark (2012) were Eliza Carthy, Martin Carthy, Simon Emmerson, Ali Friend, Andy Gangadeen, Johnny Kalsi, Sheema Mukherjee, Barney Morse Brown, Jackie Oates and Simon Richmond.

References

External links
official website (Real World Records)
official website (ECC Records)

2007 albums
Folk albums by British artists
Real World Records albums